This article contains records and statistics for the English professional football club Tottenham Hotspur.

Club records

Record wins
Record win: 13–2 v Crewe Alexandra, FA Cup, 3 February 1960
Record league victory: 9–0 v Bristol Rovers, Division 2, 22 October 1977
Record Premier League victory: 9–1 v Wigan Athletic, 22 November 2009
Most league goals scored: 10–4 v Everton, 11 October 1958.
Record cup victory: 13–2 v Crewe Alexandra, FA Cup, 3 February 1960
Record home win: 13–2 v Crewe Alexandra, FA Cup, 3 February 1960
Record UEFA Cup win: 9–0 v Keflavík (Iceland) 28 September 1971 (aggregate 15–1, including 1–6 win away on 14 September 1971)
Record away wins:
 7–0 v Tranmere Rovers, FA Cup, 4 January 2019
 6–0 v Drogheda United, UEFA Cup, 14 September 1983
 6–0 v Oldham Athletic, Football League Cup, 23 September 2004
 7–1 v Hull City, Premier League, 21 May 2017.

Record defeats

Record defeat: 0–8 v 1. FC Köln, UEFA Intertoto Cup, 22 July 1995
Record Champions League defeat: 2–7 v Bayern Munich, 1 October 2019
Most league goals conceded:  2–8 v Derby County, Division 1, 16 October 1976
Record league defeat: 0–7 v Liverpool, Division 1, 2 September 1978
Record Premier League defeat:
 1–7 v Newcastle United, 28 December 1996
 0–6 v Sheffield United, 2 March 1993
 0–6 v Manchester City, 24 November 2013
Record cup defeat: 1–6 v Newcastle United, FA Cup, 23 December 1999
Record home defeat: 0–6
v Sunderland, Football League First Division, 19 December 1914
v Arsenal, Football League First Division, 6 March 1935
Record away defeat: 0–8 v 1. FC Köln, UEFA Intertoto Cup, 22 July 1995

Additional records

Record attendance: 85,512 v Bayer Leverkusen, Champions League, 2 November 2016 (at Wembley)
Most league points (under 2 for a win system): 70, Division 2, 1919–20
Most league points (under 3 for a win system): 86, Premier League, 2016–17
Most league goals: 115, Division 1, 1960–61
Most goals in total: 270 Harry Kane, 2011–present
Most league goals in total: 220 Jimmy Greaves, 1961–70
Most goals in a season: 49 Clive Allen, 1986–87
Youngest goalscorer: Alfie Devine, 16 years, 163 days against Marine (A), 10 January 2021
Most league appearances: 655 Steve Perryman, 1969–1986
Most appearances: 854 Steve Perryman, 1969–1986
Youngest first team player: Alfie Devine, 16 years, 163 days against Marine (A), 10 January 2021
Youngest first team player in a European game: Dane Scarlett, 16 years, 247 days against Ludogorets Razgrad (H), 26 November 2020
Oldest first team player: Brad Friedel, 42 years, 176 days against Newcastle United (H), 10 November 2013
Transfer record (received): £85.3 million from Real Madrid for Gareth Bale, September 2013
Transfer record (paid): £60 million to Everton for Richarlison, July 2022

London derbies best attendances

– Arsenal:
 Tottenham 1–0 Arsenal, 83,222, 10 February 2018, Premier League, New Wembley
 Tottenham 3–1 Arsenal, 77,893, 14 April 1991, FA Cup, Old Wembley
 Arsenal 1–1 Tottenham, 72,164, 29 September 1951, Football League First Division, Highbury
 Tottenham 1–4 Arsenal, 69,821, 10 October 1953, Football League First Division, White Hart Lane

– Chelsea:
 Tottenham 2–1 Chelsea, 100,000, 20 May 1967, FA Cup, Old Wembley
 Chelsea 0–4 Tottenham, 76,000, 16 October 1920, Football League First Division, Stamford Bridge
 Tottenham 1–2 Chelsea, 73,587, 20 August 2017, Premier League, New Wembley
 Tottenham 4–0 Chelsea, 66,398, 26 February 1957, Football League First Division, White Hart Lane

– West Ham United:
 Tottenham 3–3 West Ham United, 69,118, 3 March 1956, FA Cup, White Hart Lane
 West Ham United 1–1 Tottenham, 62,450, 31 August 2022, Premier League, London Stadium
 Tottenham 2–0 West Ham United, 61,476, 19 February 2023, Premier League, Tottenham Hotspur Stadium
 Tottenham 0–1 West Ham United, 60,043, 27 April 2019, Premier League, Tottenham Hotspur Stadium

National records
The first club to win the 'Double' of the FA Cup and Top Flight Championship in the 20th Century (1960–61)
Most consecutive League victories from start of a top flight season: 11 (1960)
Most victories in a League season: 31 out of 42 games in 1960–61
Most Premier League goals scored by a player in a calendar year: 39 by Harry Kane in 2017
Most points in Division 2 season: (2 points for a win): 70 (1919–20)
The only non-league club, since the creation of the Football League in 1888, to have won the FA Cup (1901)
The first club to win the League Cup at the New Wembley (2007–08)
First team to concede 1,000 goals in the Premier League
Most goals scored in a Premier League game: 9 (joint record)
Most prolific goal scorers out of any English team in European football competition, scoring an average 2.1 goals per game

British records
The first British club to win a major European competition – European Cup Winners Cup (1963)
The first British club to win two different European Trophies – European Cup Winners Cup and UEFA Cup.
British record of eight consecutive victories in major European competition
Most matches played in the UEFA Cup / UEFA Europa League by a British club

European records
The first ever English club to win a UEFA competition (European Cup Winners' Cup, 1963)
The first club to win the UEFA Cup (1972)
The first team to score two or more goals in every UEFA Champions League group game (2010–11)
The joint biggest winning margin in a UEFA competition final - 5-1 vs Atletico Madrid (European Cup Winners' Cup, 1963)

Premier League record
For results from all of Tottenham Hotspur's seasons, see List of Tottenham Hotspur F.C. seasons

Tottenham has been a member of the Premier League since its creation in 1992–93. Coming fourth in the 2009–10 season put the club into the UEFA Champions League qualifying stages for the first time. This heralded a consistent run where Tottenham has finished in the top six in eleven consecutive seasons from 2009–10 to 2019–20, qualifying for the UEFA Champions League in four consecutive seasons from 2015–16 to 2018–19. After finishing outside of the Champions League league spots for two consecutive seasons, Tottenham finished in fourth in the 2021–22 season and qualified for the Champions League once more.

Top scorers by season

Players in bold are currently contracted to Tottenham Hotspur.

Top 10 all-time appearances

Players in bold are currently contracted to Tottenham Hotspur.

Top 10 all-time scorers

Top European competition scorers
For an in-depth review of Tottenham Hotspur in European competition, see Tottenham Hotspur F.C. in European football

Players in bold  are currently contracted to Tottenham Hotspur.

Transfers

Highest transfer fees paid

Players in bold  are currently contracted to Tottenham Hotspur.

Highest transfer fees received

Rankings
 3rd highest English all-time average attendance figure.
 Joint 3rd most successful side in all time FA Cup history with eight wins.
 6th most successful side in all time League Cup history with four wins and four runners up.
 Joint 4th most successful English side in UEFA European competitions by trophies won (3).
 10th richest club in world as ranked by Forbes.
 12th highest income in world as ranked by accountancy firm Deloitte.
 The highest number of players to represent England. (78)
 Highest number of goals scored by players representing England. (255)
 14th (joint) in number of English league titles won.
 6th in ranking of all time major honours won by football clubs in England. (26)

Honours
Sources: Tottenham Hotspur – History

Domestic
League competitions
 First Division/Premier League:
 Winners (2): 1950–51, 1960–61 (D)
 Second Division/Championship:
 Winners (2): 1919–20, 1949–50

Cup competitions
 FA Cup:
 Winners (8): 1900–01, 1920–21, 1960–61 (D), 1961–62, 1966–67, 1980–81, 1981–82, 1990–91
 League Cup:
 Winners (4): 1970–71, 1972–73, 1998–99, 2007–08
 FA Charity Shield/FA Community Shield:
 Winners (7): 1921, 1951, 1961, 1962, 1967*, 1981*, 1991* (*shared)

European
 UEFA Cup Winners' Cup:
 Winners: 1962–63
 UEFA Cup/UEFA Europa League:
 Winners (2): 1971–72, 1983–84
 Anglo-Italian League Cup:
 Winners: 1971

Historical competitions (All Levels)
 Southern League:
 Winners: 1899–1900
 Western League:
 Winners: 1903–04
 London League Premier Division Champions:
 Winners: 1902–03
 Football League South 'C' Division Champions:
 Winners: 1939–40
 Southern Professional Charity Cup:
 Winners (3): 1901–02, 1904–05, 1906–07
 Sheriff of London Charity Shield:
 Winners (2): 1901–02, 1933–34
 London Challenge Cup:
 Winners (8): 1910–11, 1928–29, 1936–37, 1947–48, 1958–59, 1963–64, 1970–71, 1973–74

Friendly tournaments
 Norwich Charity Cup:
 Winners: 1919–20
 Norwich Hospital Charity Cup
 Winners (2): 1946–47, 1949–50 (joint)
 Ipswich Hospital Charity Cup Winners:
 Winners: 1951–52 (joint)
 Costa Del Sol Tournament:
 Winners (2): 1965, 1966
 Nolia Cup:
 Winners: 1977
 Kirin Cup:
 Winners: 1979
 Sun International Challenge Trophy:
 Winners: 1983
 Peace Cup:
 Winners: 2005
 Vodacom Challenge:
 Winners (2): 2007, 2011
 Feyenoord Jubileum Tournament:
 Winners: 2008
 Barclays Asia Trophy:
 Winners: 2009
Eusébio Cup:
 Winners: 2010
AIA Cup:
Winners: 2015
Jockey Club Kitchee Centre Challenge Cup
Winners: 2017
 International Champions Cup
 Winners: 2018
 Audi Cup
 Winners: 2019
Walter Tull Memorial Cup
 Winners: 2022

Penalty shoot-out record

References

External links
Records @ UEFA.com

Records and Statistics
Tottenham Hotspur